Cigclisula is a genus of bryozoans belonging to the family Colatooeciidae.

The genus has almost cosmopolitan distribution.

Species

Species:

Cigclisula arborescens
Cigclisula areolata 
Cigclisula australis

References

Bryozoan genera